There have been several pieces of downloadable content (DLC) released for Bungie's 2017 first-person shooter video game Destiny 2. The packages of downloadable content generally add new player versus environment (PvE) missions and player versus player (PvP) modes, new locales to visit, and new items for the player to make use of. Year One of the game featured two small expansion packs. The first was Curse of Osiris in December 2017, which was followed by Warmind in May 2018.

Year Two began with one large expansion and had three premium content drops, available by way of the Annual Pass, which began Destiny 2s seasonal model. The expansion was Forsaken, which was released in September 2018 and featured an overhaul on gameplay. Upon the release of the third expansion, retailers issued Destiny 2: Forsaken Legendary Collection, which included Destiny 2 and all DLC up to and including Forsaken as well as its Annual Pass. The Annual Pass was also made available upon the release of Forsaken, with its three content drops, Season of the Forge, Season of the Drifter, and Season of Opulence, releasing in December 2018, March 2019, and June 2019, respectively. In September 2019, the Annual Pass became free to all owners of Forsaken who had not purchased the pass.

Year Three then began with the fourth expansion, Shadowkeep, which released in October 2019 as a standalone expansion, not requiring players to purchase any of the previous expansions (future content, as well as Forsaken, are also now viewed in this way). It featured four seasonal content offerings, which were available to purchase separately, unlike the seasons of the Annual Pass. These were Season of the Undying, which was released alongside Shadowkeep, followed by Season of Dawn, Season of the Worthy, and Season of Arrivals, releasing in December 2019, March 2020, and June 2020, respectively. Also alongside Shadowkeep was a re-release of Destiny 2 called New Light, which made the base game free-to-play, and also included Curse of Osiris and Warmind.

Year Four began with the fifth expansion, Beyond Light, released in November 2020 along with four seasonal content offerings, the first of which, Season of the Hunt, released alongside the expansion, followed by Season of the Chosen in February 2021, Season of the Splicer in May 2021, and then Season of the Lost in August 2021. Beyond Lights release has thus far had the largest effect on the game, as nearly half of the game's content was removed from the game and placed into what Bungie calls the Destiny Content Vault (DCV), which also includes all content from the original Destiny. The content that was removed from the game includes Destiny 2s original base campaign, The Red War (which was replaced by a new player quest), the Curse of Osiris and Warmind expansions, and the content of Year Two's Annual Pass (with the small exception of Gambit Prime from Season of the Drifter, which was slightly tweaked and replaced the three-round Gambit and also renamed as Gambit). Bungie plans to cycle content in and out of the DCV, updating older areas as necessary.

Year Five began with the sixth expansion, The Witch Queen, which released in February 2022 alongside the first of four regular seasonal content offerings, called Season of the Risen. With the release of the season and expansion, the free-roam location known as "The Tangled Shore" and the Forsaken expansion's story campaign were rotated into the DCV.

Year Six began with the release of the seventh expansion, Lightfall, in February 2023. There will also be a final chapter in 2024 marking Year Seven, The Final Shape, to close out the first saga of Destiny, called the "Light and Darkness Saga," before beginning a new saga for the franchise.

Overview
Prior to the release of Destiny 2 in September 2017, Bungie said that they had already begun work on post-release content. Bungie said they planned on providing post-release content at a quicker rate than that of the original Destiny, which was criticized for not having enough content post-launch and between each of its expansions' releases. Bungie also announced the Destiny 2 Expansion Pass prior to launch, which granted access to the first two minor expansions of the game, Curse of Osiris and Warmind. Throughout Year 1, Destiny 2 featured periodical holiday-themed events, in addition to the expansions. Year 2 featured one large expansion, Forsaken, the periodical events, and three premium content drops, available via the Annual Pass, which began Destiny 2s seasonal model.

Like the original game, whenever a new expansion released for Destiny 2, players were required to have purchased the preceding expansions in order to be able to play the newer one. Beginning with the Shadowkeep expansion in October 2019, which began Year 3, it and all future expansions and seasonal content (and including Forsaken) are considered standalone experiences, not requiring the player to have bought the preceding additional content. Additionally, seasons can now be purchased à la carte in the form of season passes. Alongside Shadowkeep, Bungie also made the base game of Destiny 2 free-to-play under a release titled New Light (which included access to Curse of Osiris and Warmind).

Year 4, which began with the Beyond Light expansion in November 2020, saw a major overhaul on the game with the introduction of the Destiny Content Vault (DCV), which includes all content from the original Destiny. Upon this initial implementation of the DCV, Bungie removed the original Destiny 2s base campaign, "The Red War" (and replaced it with a new player quest), as well as the Curse of Osiris and Warmind expansions, and the content of Year 2's Annual Pass (with the minor exception of Gambit Prime, which replaced Gambit). Bungie plans to cycle content in and out of the game, updating older locations to fit the current state of the game. Furthermore, Bungie has three additional expansions planned, The Witch Queen, Lightfall (working title), and The Final Shape. The first two were originally planned for release in fall 2021 and fall 2022, respectively, but were delayed to early 2022 and early 2023, with the third coming in early 2024, which will conclude the first saga of Destiny, called the "Light and Darkness Saga".

Year 1 Expansion Pass (2017–2018)
Like the original Destiny, an Expansion Pass was available alongside the release of Destiny 2, which granted access to the first two minor expansions of the game, Curse of Osiris and Warmind. While the expansions were available to purchase separately upon their respective releases, the Expansion Pass included the first two expansions at a discounted price versus buying them separately—the Expansion Pass was US$35 where the two expansions were US$20 each.

Curse of Osiris

Destiny 2s first DLC pack, Curse of Osiris, was released on December 5, 2017. The expansion added new content and focused on the character Osiris from the lore of the original Destiny and for whom the Trials of Osiris PvP mode in the original was named. The expansion took players to the planet Mercury with its own patrol mode. Certain missions and strikes required players to progress through the Infinite Forest, an area that featured procedurally-generated terrain and enemies, and which had been reused for the Halloween-themed event Festival of the Lost, rebranded as the Haunted Forest. Additionally, the EXP-level cap was raised to 25 and the Power level cap was raised to 330. In addition to the character Osiris, his Ghost named Sagira was added with a female voice, as well as the character Brother Vance from the original game, who was the Non-player character (NPC) of Mercury in The Lighthouse (formerly an exclusive social space in Destiny for those who went flawless in Trials of Osiris). There was also a timed-exclusive Crucible map for PS4 players called Wormhaven. Instead of an entirely new raid, a new feature called raid lair was added, featuring new areas to the existing Leviathan raid and a different final boss.

Plot
In the aftermath of The Red War, Ikora Rey calls the Guardian to the Tower. She explains that her intelligence agents, the Hidden, have discovered a damaged Ghost on the remnants of Mercury. Ikora identifies the Ghost as Sagira, belonging to her former mentor, the legendary Warlock Osiris, who had been exiled from the City years before the first game, due to his obsession with the Vex. Traveling to Mercury, the Guardian locates the gateway to the Infinite Forest, a simulated universe created by the Vex inside the planet's core, but is unable to enter. Brother Vance, the fanatical leader of the Cult of Osiris, directs the Guardian to a hidden temple in the EDZ containing a modified Vex device that can restore Sagira. The device temporarily places Sagira's programming in the Guardian's Ghost, allowing them to access the gateway to the Forest.

Inside the Forest, the Guardian encounters numerous reflections of Osiris, copies of the Warlock created by himself to explore the Forest's different simulated realities. The reflections explain that in the past, Mercury had been a garden world shaped by the Traveler, before the Vex arrived and created the Forest in Mercury's core. The Guardian witnesses a simulated future scenario created by Panoptes, Infinite Mind, that controls the Infinite Forest, in which Light and Darkness no longer exist, all non-Vex life has been wiped out, and the Sun is darkened. Osiris' reflections claim that they have been unable to find a way to prevent the dark future, but believe that the Guardian may be the key to stopping it. Ikora directs the Guardian to the Pyramidion, a Vex construct on Io, which contains the location of a map that leads to Panoptes' lair. Following the Pyramidion's data back to the Forest and battling Red Legion simulations within, Sagira discovers that the map changes too quickly to find Panoptes. The Guardian travels to Nessus to obtain the core of a smaller Vex Mind to boost Sagira's processing power. Returning to the Forest's simulated past on a tip from Ikora, the Guardian combines the map data with Panoptes' algorithms from the moment of its creation, allowing Sagira to locate Panoptes' lair. At that moment, Panoptes itself arrives and forcibly separates Sagira from Ghost before ejecting the Guardian from the Forest.

Regrouping at the Tower, Ikora accompanies the Guardian back to Mercury, where she forces open the gateway to allow the Guardian to return to the Forest. Upon reaching Panoptes' lair, the Guardian fights through Panoptes' simulated legions, but is unable to damage the Vex Mind alone; Panoptes prepares to "delete" the Guardian from the Forest when Osiris himself arrives to aid the Guardian. Osiris is able to hold Panoptes at bay long enough for the Guardian to weaken and then destroy Panoptes, freeing Sagira and preventing the dark future from occurring. The Guardian and Osiris emerge from the gateway, where Ikora invites Osiris to return to the City. Osiris declines, and bids farewell to his former student and the Guardian before returning to the Infinite Forest.

Following the defeat of Panoptes, Emperor Calus extends another invitation to travel to the Leviathan on Nessus, where the fireteam of Guardians venture deep into the Leviathan's core to confront Argos, Planetary Core, the Vex Mind which was responsible for the transformation of Nessus, who the Leviathan started to consume until Argos forced the intake to stop ("Leviathan: Eater of Worlds" raid lair). After destroying Argos, the Guardians are nearly consumed by the Leviathan's fiery inferno, but are saved by Calus, who once again offers a place by his side and more than just the power of the Light.

Critical reception

Curse of Osiris received "mixed or average" reviews, according to review aggregator Metacritic.

Destructoid called the token-based loot system a "major problem" while also lamenting the lack of leaderboards, sufficient loot rewards, engaging procedural exploration, and a quality sandbox, and went on to call Curse of Osiris one of the worst Destiny add-ons to date, alongside House of Wolves. Though Game Informer reviewed the title slightly more positively, they took issue with the shallow features, characters, and new locations, but noted that the several fun activities and loot chases available tempered frustration with the DLC. GameRevolution gave some praise to the additions made to the lore and the premise of the Infinite Forest, but criticized the title for being a paid update with a boring, short, and asset-recycling campaign. GameSpot felt that the Raid Lair was engaging and that new loot showed off quality gunplay, but took major issue with the fact that the campaign offered a half-baked story, tedious busywork, and reused content. GamesRadar+ praised the stunning visual design, new Forge weapons, and the addition of the Raid boss but thought that the campaign and Raid mode were underwhelming due to a lack of meaningful, long-term content additions. IGN gave the title a 5.5 out of 10 and wrote, "[Curse of Osiris'] campaign and story are a bust, its new content is mixed and buggy at best, and it does nothing to address the community’s loud cries for fixes to the endgame. The few redeeming features are its more challenging and varied Adventures, and the Raid Lair’s puzzles and tough boss battle." Push Square was frustrated with the game's squandered potential and Bungie's repetition of previously made mistakes, and stated, "For its asking price, there's no reason not to expect more from this first expansion. The story missions range from okay to insultingly dull, and the one truly interesting concept that Bungie introduces -- the Infinite Forest -- ends up being little more than a tedious shooting gallery."

Warmind

Warmind was released on May 8, 2018 and focused on the Warmind Rasputin from the original game. The expansion took players to the planet Mars in an area called Hellas Basin—the original Destiny had also featured the planet Mars, but in a different location on the planet. The expansion also featured a new mode called "Escalation Protocol", a horde mode which could be started by any player in the patrol mode on Mars. Players fought seven waves of Hive enemies, which culminated in a fight with one of five unique bosses that rotated weekly. A maximum of three players in a fireteam could participate in the mode, but other players in the patrol area could also join the activity. As well, the EXP level cap was raised to 30 and the Power level cap was raised to 380. In addition to Rasputin, a new character named Ana Bray (also from the lore of the original Destiny) was added, who served as the primary NPC on Mars. A timed-exclusive Strike called "The Insight Terminus" was also added for PS4 players. Like the previous expansion, Warmind also included a raid lair on the Leviathan. The expansion also added a progressive ranking system for PvP, titled Valor and Glory—this ranking system was not removed from the game when Beyond Light released in November 2020. Valor is earned in quickplay matches while Glory is earned in competitive matches, with each new rank earning greater rewards—Valor points are earned regardless of win or loss, while Glory points are earned by wins but reduced by losses.

Plot
Several months after the events of Curse of Osiris, the Guardian sets out for Mars, the first place where Humanity encountered the Traveler, pursuing the remnants of the Red Legion as they scavenge across the Solar System in their retreat. As the Guardian's ship arrives, orbital weapon platforms known as Warsats begin falling out of orbit and smashing into the surface. The Guardian receives a distress call on the Vanguard's private comm channel from a Hunter named Ana Bray, warning that the Hive have broken out of the southern polar icecaps and are attacking the Clovis Bray Research Facility at Hellas Basin. The Guardian goes to the surface to assist Bray, who reveals that the central core of the ancient Warmind Rasputin, which controlled the Warsats, is inside the facility, and that the encounters with Rasputin in the Cosmodrome on Earth (as seen in the original Destiny) were fragments of his personality left behind following the Collapse. Reluctant to involve the Vanguard due to its policy of not pursuing past lives, Bray asks the Guardian to help her get inside Clovis Bray and protect Rasputin. From her ability to access the security systems, it is revealed that Bray had been a scientist at the facility, operated by her family, in her life before becoming a Guardian.

As the Guardian fights through hordes of Hive to reach Rasputin's central core, the Warmind activates a javelin-like weapon called the Valkyrie to assist the Guardian in battling through the elite Hive forces. As the Guardian and Bray enter Rasputin's core, however, they are confronted by Commander Zavala, who excoriates Bray for focusing on her past life in defiance of Vanguard law, instead of helping the Guardians fight against Ghaul on Earth. As the facility shakes, Zavala reveals that Rasputin was "not the only thing to awaken on Mars". A Hive worm god called Xol, Will of the Thousands, has also arisen, and is directing the frozen hordes of Hive around Clovis Bray to attack the facility and destroy Rasputin. Bray insists that Rasputin is the key to defeating Xol, but Zavala refuses, considering Rasputin to be too dangerous.

To bait Xol, Zavala sends the Guardian back to the EDZ on Earth, to investigate another shard of the Traveler broken off when it awakened at the end of the Red War. The Guardian finds the fragment in a Taken containment shield, and Bray is able to call upon Rasputin to retarget a Warsat in Earth orbit to fire on the fragment, disabling the shield. Returning to Mars with the fragment, the Guardian ventures into the Hive's caverns deep beneath Hellas Basin to locate Xol's feeding ground, where they encounter Nokris, Herald of Xol and the exiled younger son of Oryx, the Taken King (who was killed in The Taken King). After the Guardian defeats Nokris, they set down the fragment. Xol emerges, ignoring the fragment and burying the Guardian in the collapsing ice caves. Though the Guardian is able to crawl out of the rubble, Bray warns that Xol is heading directly for the Clovis Bray facility to destroy Rasputin, which would make the worm god all but unbeatable. Setting aside his reservations about the Warmind, Zavala reluctantly agrees to Bray's plan to use Rasputin in order to destroy Xol.

As the Guardian fights through Xol's hordes, Bray calls on the Guardian to overload Rasputin's core to channel more power into the Valkyrie. After disabling the cooling system and forcing a core meltdown, the Guardian emerges on an exterior platform to confront Xol. With Bray's help in stabilizing the power to generate Valkyrie javelins, the Guardian destroys Xol in a pitched battle. The Guardian then joins Bray and Zavala at Rasputin's central core. Speaking in Russian (with Bray as translator), the Warmind declares that while the Bray family sought to make him into an "all-seeing savior", and the Vanguard sought to wield him as a "primitive weapon", he would define his own existence from now on, and defend Humanity on his own terms. Rasputin then releases a new network of Warsats to the edges of the Solar System and beyond, to ensure that "never again will a threat go unseen".

Following Xol's defeat, the remnants of the Red Legion, led by Val Ca'uor, assault the Leviathan in an attempt to assassinate Emperor Calus and seize the ship. Calus once again calls upon Guardians to his aid ("Leviathan: Spire of Stars" raid lair). With aid from Calus's psychic powers and one of his android duplicates, the Guardians repel the Red Legion assault and defeat Ca'uor. Calus then congratulates the Guardians for their efforts and tells them he awaits the day they stand by his side when the end comes. Although it was believed that Xol was destroyed, it is soon discovered after the defeat of Ca'uor that the worm god had in fact survived; the Guardian discovers an anomaly deep in the Grove of Ulan-Tan on Io, where Xol had been communing with the Taken there ever since being defeated by the Guardian. The Guardian investigates the anomaly and eliminates the Taken there, including three former enemies who were resurrected and Taken by Xol—Ta'aurc, Aspect of War; Urzok, Aspect of Hate; and Drevis, Aspect of Darkness. After eliminating the Taken, the Guardian obtains an exotic heavy sniper rifle called the Whisper of the Worm, revealed to be Xol itself transformed into a weapon so it could feed off the Guardian's kills in combat.

Reception 

Warmind received "mixed or average" reviews, according to review aggregator Metacritic.

Destructoid called the addition of the Escalation Protocol mode the "shining star of the DLC" and noted that the expansion marked the beginning towards making Destiny 2 a more complete experience, while writing, "Destiny 2: Warmind is a better effort than Osiris, but its limited scope and re-used concepts prevent it from attaining greatness." Game Informer was pleasantly surprised by the addition of substantial lore given Warmind's limited scope, and praised the Escalation Protocol mode, but noted that the lack of meaningful matchmaking kept it from reaching its full potential. GameRevolution similarly wrote that while Warmind was better than Curse of Osiris, the lack of good matchmaking and improvements to the core gameplay showed that Bungie was not listening to player feedback. GameSpot praised the addition of content catered towards hardcore players but disliked the rushed story, boring midgame activities, and repurposed story missions in the form of Strikes. IGN gave the game a 6 out of 10 and wrote, "[Warmind] leaves you with only a short campaign, old content to replay, and a handful of new PVP maps to try while you wait. Warmind feels like two steps forward, two steps back yet again for Bungie." Push Square thought that Warmind struggled to justify its price tag with its tired mission design and throwaway campaign feeling like a stopgap before the arrival of the next big expansion.

Major expansions (2018–present)
Like the original Destiny, Destiny 2 features a major expansion released nearly annually. Originally, a major expansion released each fall, but this shifted to the beginning of the calendar year in 2022. These large expansions typically have a major impact on the game, versus the minor content drops, such as the two small expansions of Year 1 and the seasonal content introduced in Year 2. There have thus far been four major expansions released for Destiny 2—Forsaken in September 2018, Shadowkeep in October 2019, Beyond Light in November 2020, and The Witch Queen in February 2022. The year 2021 was the only year to not see a major expansion released due to The Witch Queens delay, which was originally planned for November 2021. This also delayed Lightfall to February 2023, which was originally planned for fall 2022. Another expansion, The Final Shape, will release in early 2024 and will conclude Destiny 2s first major saga. Each major expansion marks the beginning of a new year in Destiny 2s lifecycle.

Year 2: Forsaken

The first major expansion of Destiny 2 but third expansion overall, Forsaken was released on September 4, 2018, beginning Year 2 of Destiny 2. Similar to the original Destinys The Taken King expansion, Forsaken had a large overhaul on gameplay, though not to the extent that The Taken King had with the original Destiny. A large expansion, the story has a "western revenge" theme, according to Bungie, taking place across the Reef's Tangled Shore and the Dreaming City. The season's story follows events after Cayde-6 is killed while trying to contain a prisoner outbreak at the Prison of Elders initiated by Uldren Sov, seeking his lost sister Queen Mara Sov. The Guardian seeking justice on both Uldren and the Scorned Barons complicit in Cayde's death. A new enemy species, the Scorn, was introduced, undead Fallen raised by the power of dark ether under Uldren's and the Scorned Barons' control. A new Raid "The Last Wish" was introduced, and dungeon named "The Shattered Throne." A new team-based competitive mode, Gambit, was introduced, where two teams of four players compete against each other, collecting motes from downed hostile enemies to try to fill a bank and summon a primeval Taken and kill it before the other team can. There were player sandbox changes as well, with the edition of a new subclass tree for each already existing subclass, effectively adding six new supers abilities to the game, alongside a new weapon type, a bow and arrow.

With the release of The Witch Queen in February 2022, portions of Forsaken were removed from the game and placed in the Destiny Content Vault; this included the Forsaken campaign and the Tangled Shore destination and its associated activities, but not the Dreaming City or its endgame content. Ahead of this, Forsakens campaign was made free-to-play on December 7, 2021, and a special Forsaken pass, containing access to Forsakens endgame content and exotics, was also released for players to purchase who did not already own Forsaken.

Year 3: Shadowkeep

On June 6, 2019, Bungie announced the next expansion, Shadowkeep, which was planned to be released on September 17, 2019, but was delayed to October 1, 2019. The expansion is set on the Moon and is similar in scale to Forsaken. Shadowkeep follows the discovery of a strange pyramid-shaped ship deep within the Moon, eventually leading to a return the Black Garden in the new raid Garden of Salvation. The story soon tied to an approaching fleet of other pyramid ships belonging to the Darkness during season 11, Season of Arrivals. Sandbox changes that came with this expansion included finishers and a new enemy archetype called Champions. These enemies required mods from the newly added artifact system. The dungeon Pit of Heresy was also added. Shadowkeep does not have any dependencies on previous DLC. Its release coincides with a number of changes brought upon by Bungie breaking away from its publishing agreement with Activision, including the transition of the PC version from Battle.net to Steam, release for the Stadia cloud gaming platform, cross-save support between platforms, discontinuation of PlayStation 4-exclusive content, and release of a "foundational" version of Destiny 2 as a free-to-play title, under the name "New Light", which also included the first two expansions.

Year 4: Beyond Light

On June 9, 2020, Bungie announced the fifth expansion, Beyond Light, which was planned to be released on September 22, 2020, but was delayed to November 10, 2020 due to the COVID-19 pandemic. The expansion is set on Europa, a moon of Jupiter, and is similar in scale to Forsaken and Shadowkeep. As the Darkness takes over parts of the System, Eramis, Kell of the Fallen House of Salvation, discovers a way to wield the Darkness through Stasis, and seeks revenge against the Traveler for abandoning the Fallen. During the story, the  Guardian is also gifted the power of Stasis by the darkness and comes to accept it to fight back, leading to questions of the Darkness's true purpose in the system. The new raid released with this expansion was the Deep Stone Crypt, tying in with the side story of the Clovis Bray and his granddaughters, Elsie and Ana Bray. As part of this narrative, Beyond Light removed Titan, Io, Mars, and Mercury worlds and activities, as they were taken over by the Darkness and no longer possible to locate. These locations were placed them in a Destiny Content Vault as part of Bungie's goal to have better management of the game's content for future expansions, with the potential to later unvault these locations in a reworked fashion in future content updates. The expansion also brought back the Cosmodrome on Earth as a playable destination as well as a revamped "Vault of Glass" raid from the first game later in the year. Similar to Shadowkeep, Beyond Light is a standalone expansion and will not require any dependencies on previous DLC.

Year 5: The Witch Queen

On August 24, 2021, Bungie announced the sixth expansion, The Witch Queen, which released on February 22, 2022. The expansion is set in Savathûn's Throne World, and the expansion revolves around Savathûn, the Witch Queen, who is the sister of Oryx, the Taken King, and is similar in scale to the previous three expansions. In this expansion, Savathûn has managed to harness Light to build an army of Hive Guardians with Ghosts of their own to fight against the Guardians of the Last City. The Guardian enters Savathûn's Throne World within the Ascendant Realm to fight back against her Lucent Brood. The expansion also introduces weapon crafting, a brand new first-person melee weapon, the glaive, as well as a Master-level difficulty of The Witch Queen campaign. Similar to Shadowkeep and Beyond Light,  The Witch Queen is a standalone expansion and does not require any dependencies on previous DLC. The expansion not only features a new raid, but will also feature a revamped "King's Fall" raid from the original Destinys The Taken King expansion later in the year.

Year 6: Lightfall

On August 23, 2022, Bungie announced Lightfall, the seventh expansion that will begin Year 6 of Destiny 2s lifecycle, would be released on February 28, 2023. The expansion will be set in a mysterious, technologically-advanced city of Neomuna, located on Neptune, and will revolve around Emperor Calus, now a Disciple of the Witness, as he, the Witness, the Black Fleet, and their army of Shadow Legion Cabal and Pyramid Tormentors invade Neomuna enroute to the Traveler in the Last City. The Guardian will meet the Cloud Striders, the alternate descendants of humanity and inhabitants of Neomuna, who will help the Guardian discover the power of Strand, a new Darkness-based subclass based on psychic energy and movement, and are able to use a Strand grappling hook to traverse the Neomuna skyline. Originally planned for a fall 2022 release, it was delayed to early 2023 due to the delay of The Witch Queen.

Year 7: The Final Shape
Bungie had originally planned for Lightfall to cap off Destiny 2s first major saga, but after realizing that Lightfall was not enough, Bungie announced that The Final Shape would release in early 2024 as the eighth expansion that would begin Year 7 of Destiny 2. It will conclude the first major saga of Destiny 2, called the "Light and Darkness Saga", before the start of the next saga.

Seasonal content
Year 2 of Destiny 2 introduced a seasonal model for the game, in which content is released periodically throughout the year. There are four seasons for the year, and each season adds new activities and new narrative content for the game, though these are minor content drops in comparison to the major expansions. In addition to having names for each season (e.g., Season of the Forge), the seasons also have a numerical categorization. As Year 1 did not have seasons, its three releases were reworked under this numerical seasonal categorization: Destiny 2s original base campaign, "The Red War", is regarded as Season 1, with Curse of Osiris and Warmind being Season 2 and Season 3, respectively. Forsaken began Season 4, which is also known as Season of the Outlaw and covers the period from Forsakens release until the release of Season of the Forge (September–December 2018). Beginning with Shadowkeep, the expansion's content and narrative occurs simultaneously with the year's first season (e.g., Season of the Undying was its own seasonal content that was released and occurred simultaneously with Shadowkeep; this was different from Season of the Outlaw, which was just the name for that period of time but was not its own separate content from Forsaken).

Year 2 Annual Pass (2018–2019)
The Annual Pass was released alongside the third expansion, Forsaken. It was available as a bundle with the expansion or could be purchased separately; however, players had to own Forsaken to access the content of the Annual Pass. It included three premium downloadable content packages that were released over the course of Year 2, which were Season of the Forge in December 2018, Season of the Drifter in March 2019, and Season of Opulence in June 2019. This was Bungie's initial seasonal content model, however, although there were three content packages, these could not be purchased separately and had to be purchased altogether in the Annual Pass. Content in these drops included new endgame challenges, new weapons, armor, and "vanity rewards" to collect, new and returning Exotics, new pinnacle activities, new triumph records to collect, and new lore to discover. All of the content of the Annual Pass became free to all owners of Forsaken on September 18, 2019 just prior to the release of the next expansion, Shadowkeep, which changed the way in which seasonal content is purchased and delivered. With the release of the Beyond Light expansion on November 10, 2020, the content of the Annual Pass was removed from the game and entered into the Destiny Content Vault (DCV), with the exception of Gambit Prime from Season of the Drifter, which was slightly reworked and became the new Gambit, replacing the three-round version originally introduced with Forsaken. Bungie stated that content entered into the DCV may be remastered and reintroduced into Destiny 2 at a later time.

Season passes (2019–present)
Year 3 (2019–2020)
With the release of Shadowkeep, which began Year 3 of Destiny 2, Bungie changed the way in which seasonal content is delivered. Unlike the Annual Pass that was released alongside Forsaken, seasons can now be purchased à la carte in the form of season passes. Also introduced were "seasonal ranks", which work as battle passes. Seasonal ranks are divided into a free track and a premium track, with each track granting rewards at any given tier; there are 100 tiers of rewards for both tracks (players can rank up beyond level 100 but there are no predetermined rewards except a bright engram every five levels). Season pass holders have access to the rewards for both the free and premium tracks, as well as season-exclusive weapons and gear, materials, universal ornaments, and exotic quests. Only players who purchase the season passes have access to each season's exclusive seasonal activity, which players' actions during these activities have major effects on the game world and progress the story forward. Also introduced was the seasonal artifact with season-specific mods for each season, although players could only unlock 12 of the 25 available mods (players could also reset their artifact to select different mods). Additionally, leveling up the seasonal artifact gives bonus Power levels to players, which allows them to go beyond the Power level cap of Pinnacle gear. Each season has a different seasonal artifact in relation to the seasonal narrative. Unlike the previous year (Year 2), the seasonal activities of Year 3 became unavailable at the conclusion of each season. There were four named seasons for Year 3: Season of the Undying, which was available alongside Shadowkeeps release in October 2019, Season of Dawn in December 2019, Season of the Worthy in March 2020, and Season of Arrivals in June 2020.

Year 4 (2020–2022)
Year 4, which began with Beyond Light, continued Year 3's seasonal model, with a couple of exceptions. The content of previous seasons in Year 4 could be experienced all year, regardless of when a player began playing, much like the seasons of Year 2's Annual Pass, though the player had to still purchase each season's seasonal pass to access the content. Some seasonal triumphs, however, could only be completed during the active season. The narrative across each season in Year 4 was also more interconnected instead of being cut into individual seasonal arcs like in previous years. Season 13 introduced Seasonal Challenges that could be completed at anytime during the active season in Bungie's attempt to remove "FOMO" (fear of missing out) for players who were not be able to login every week. Season 14 reduced the Power level increases for each non-expansion season to 10 (previously 50), meaning that players who had maxed out their gear in the prior season would only have to level up through pinnacle gear activities; this was in response to player complaints about the grind required at the start of each season. There were also four named seasons for Year 4: Season of the Hunt, which was available alongside Beyond Lights release in November 2020, Season of the Chosen in February 2021, Season of the Splicer in May 2021, and then Season of the Lost in August 2021, which ran to February 2022, thus being the longest season in Destiny 2 thus far, lasting six months due to the delay of The Witch Queen. Due to this delay, the Bungie 30th Anniversary Pack was released in December 2021, adding two new activities and gear inspired by Bungie's previous games from the past 30 years. Upon the release of The Witch Queen, all of Year 4's seasonal content was removed from the game except for the Battlegrounds activity that was introduced in Season of the Chosen and the content of the Bungie 30th Anniversary Pack. Battlegrounds and strikes were merged into one singular playlist called the Vanguard Operations.

Year 5 (2022–2023)
Year 5, which began with The Witch Queen, continued Year 4's seasonal model. There were four seasons for Year 5: Season of the Risen, which was available alongside The Witch Queens release in February 2022, Season of the Haunted in May 2022, Season of Plunder in August 2022, and Season of the Seraph in December 2022, which ran until Lightfalls launch in February 2023. Unlike the previous two years, in which the season that was released alongside the expansion began its narrative the week after the expansion's launch, Season of the Risens narrative began the same day as The Witch Queen. Additionally, beginning with Season 16, players can unlock all 25 mods from the seasonal artifact, although each mod beyond the 12th has an increasing experience cost to obtain. Season 17 introduced Triumph Seals for the Iron Banner PvP mode as well as the seasonal events. Season 19 removed planetary materials as a resource for upgrades and currency, and while the planetary materials can still be found on destinations, they are converted to glimmer when collected. Upon the release of Lightfall, all of Year 5's seasonal content was removed from the game except for the respective battlegrounds activities from Season of the Risen and Season of the Seraph, which were merged into the Vanguard Operations playlist.

Year 6 (2023–present)
Year 6, which began with Lightfall, continues Year 5's seasonal model. There are four planned seasons for Year 6: Season of Defiance, which released alongside Lightfall in February 2023, which will be followed by Season of the Deep in May, and two unnamed seasons to be released later in the year. Season 20 comes with the expansion, while similar to Year 2, all seasons can be purchased together in the Annual Pass (or purchased separately). Season 21 will introduce a weekly exotic mission rotator, similar to the raids and dungeons rotator, and will bring back previously vaulted exotic missions, but unlike the raids and dungeons, each returning exotic mission will only be available during their respective week in the rotation. The mods on the seasonal artifact have also been replaced with unique, unlockable perks which only 12 can be active per character, and these perks are applied passively when active; moreover, resetting the artifact to change perks is now free.

Bungie 30th Anniversary Pack
Due to the delay of The Witch Queen from November 2021 to February 2022, Bungie released the Bungie 30th Anniversary Pack''' on December 7, 2021, as a mid-season update for Season 15, Season of the Lost. The content package was part of a 30th-anniversary event for the developer. The paid pack includes access to a pirate-themed dungeon called Grasp of Avarice, which takes place on Earth's Cosmodrome within the infamous "loot cave" from the original Destiny, as well as an exotic quest to obtain the rocker launcher Gjallarhorn, a returning exotic from the original Destiny which was updated with an exotic catalyst. Through the dungeon, players discover that a previous team of Guardians, led by Wilhelm-7, were lured to the infamous loot cave by Fallen due to a promise of riches, which resulted in a descent into madness for Wilhelm and the deaths of his fireteam, and ultimately, himself.

Bungie also added free content alongside the 30th Anniversary Pack, available to all players. The free content included a six-player PvE activity called Dares of Eternity, which takes the form of a game show hosted by exotic items merchant Xûr. The activity has players battling through two waves of random enemies, determined by the spin of a wheel, followed by a boss fight with one of three bosses; the players who guess the correct boss receive infinite heavy ammo for the boss fight. A bonus round after the boss fight may also occur at random. Players can visit Xûr and the mythical Starhorse in Xûr's Treasure Hoard to collect bounties for the Dares of Eternity activity, as well as open chests based on their reputation rank with Xûr. Rewards from the activity include weapons and armor inspired by Bungie's previous games—Marathon, Myth, and Halo—as well as an exotic quest for the sidearm Forerunner, based on the M6 magnums from Halo.

Although released during a season, the Bungie 30th Anniversary Pack has been exempt from the content vaulting of seasonal content that occurs with the release of each major expansion. Furthermore, Bungie has used Dares of Eternity as a source to obtain some gear from previously vaulted seasons.

Limited-time events
Like the original Destiny, Destiny 2 features a number of limited-time events throughout each year. With the introduction of the seasonal model in Year 2, there is at least one main limited-time event each season. Since the second Dawning event (December 2018 – January 2019), NPC Eva Levante has served as the main vendor for the majority of these events. Additionally, and with the exception of the Faction Rallies, the Tower social space is redecorated for these events—the former Farm social space also saw a redecoration during The Dawning event, but that social space was removed and entered into the Destiny Content Vault in November 2020. During Season of the Haunted in Year 5, Bungie introduced Triumph Seals for the four main seasonal events (Guardian Games, Solstice, Festival of the Lost, and The Dawning).

Faction Rally
Faction Rallies were a new periodical one-week event for Destiny 2. The event let players pledge their allegiance to one of three factions, Dead Orbit, Future War Cult, or New Monarchy—these factions were in the original Destiny with faction vendors that could be accessed at anytime. The faction vendors from the original Destiny also returned to reprise their roles: Arach Jalaal of Dead Orbit, Lakshmi-2 of Future War Cult, and Executor Hideo of New Monarchy. After pledging allegiance to a faction, players completed various activities to earn experience points, which would in turn reward faction tokens to unlock special packages from the pledged faction. The faction with the most points by the end of the week earned a discount on a powerful weapon from the faction while players who had pledged to a losing faction could still purchase the weapon but for a much higher price (players of the winning faction could purchase the weapon for 1,000 Glimmer whereas players of the losing factions had to pay 50,000 Glimmer).

A total of eight Faction Rallies occurred throughout Year 1 of the game but were removed in Year 2. The first Faction Rally occurred from September 26–October 2, 2017, then the second from November 7–13, the third from January 16–22, 2018, the fourth from February 20–26, the fifth from March 20–26, the sixth from June 5–11, the seventh from June 26–July 3, and the last occurring from July 17–24. In August 2018, Bungie announced that the event would go on hiatus for season 4 of the game. However, it remained in hiatus until February 2020 when game director Luke Smith confirmed that there were no plans to bring back Faction Rallies. Furthermore, at the conclusion of Season of the Splicer in August 2021, Lakshmi-2 was killed in battle and the three factions left Earth.

The Dawning
The Dawning is an annual holiday themed event that runs from December to January. It was originally introduced during Year 3 of the original Destiny and returned for Destiny 2. Since Year 2's event, the main activity for players is to bake cookies with various ingredients earned from defeated enemies and deliver these cookies to the various NPCs throughout the different destinations in the game. Through quests, baking various numbers of cookies grants event-related rewards.

The first Dawning event for Destiny 2 began on December 19, 2017, and ended on January 9, 2018. Players could create snowballs in the social spaces, as well as during strikes and throw these at other players or enemies (which damaged enemies). The Crucible game mode "Mayhem" (all abilities restore rapidly) was also brought back from the original Destiny. New Milestones with event-themed rewards were also added, and players could send gifts to friends that contained random items.

The following year, The Dawning was held from December 11, 2018, to January 1, 2019, during Year 2's Season of the Forge and saw the return of Eva Levante, an NPC from the original game who served as the main vendor for the event. This year's event introduced the cookie baking activity. Completing this year's event's quests granted rewards, such as the legendary machine gun Avalanche and an exotic sparrow called Dawning. The next Dawning event occurred during Year 3's Season of Dawn and was held from December 17, 2019, to January 5, 2020. Quest rewards included the exotic sparrow Alpine Dash and the legendary submachine gun Cold Front. The fourth Dawning event occurred during Year 4's Season of the Hunt from December 15, 2020, to January 5, 2021. Through the event's quests, players could earn the Spiritfarer 7M exotic ship with different cosmetic upgrades, as well as the legendary fusion rifle Glacioclasm. Due to The Witch Queen expansion being delayed to February 2022, the fifth Dawning event also took place in Year 4 and during its final season, Season of the Lost, from December 14, 2021, to January 4, 2022. The event returned in Year 5 during Season of the Seraph, from December 13, 2022, to January 3, 2023. An Event Card was added for the 2022 event, featuring event-specific challenges and can be upgraded via Silver to unlock exclusive rewards, as well as new cosmetics, an event Triumph Seal, and the new legendary Stasis pulse rifle Stay Frosty.

Crimson Days
Crimson Days was a Valentine's Day-themed event and was also first introduced in the original Destiny during its Year 2, but did not return in Year 3 of that game; however, the event was brought back during Year 1 of Destiny 2. Just as in the original event, Crimson Days was a one-week event that featured a 2-versus-2 Crucible mode—the only in Destiny 2—however, the mode was modified from the original. Staying close to a teammate caused all abilities to recharge quicker, while being apart gave away both players' locations to the opposing team. Players could also earn Crimson Engrams, granting new rewards. Crucible vendor Lord Shaxx was the NPC for this event.

The first Crimson Days event for Destiny 2 began on February 13 and ran through February 20, 2018. The event returned the following year during Year 2's Season of the Forge, running from February 12 to 19, 2019. The third event was held from February 11 to 18, 2020, during Year 3's Season of Dawn. The event was discontinued in 2021, with Bungie citing that the event had not been up to their standards in recent years and they decided to place it into the Destiny Content Vault.

Solstice (of Heroes)
Solstice (called Solstice of Heroes until 2022) is an annual summer event that runs from July to August. Players are given an armor set and throughout the event, upgrade it to become a viable armor set for players to use. This event's featured activity during Years 2 to 4 was the European Aerial Zone (EAZ). In this activity, a team of three players had a set time to battle Hive, Cabal, or Fallen foes and hunt mini-bosses throughout the space, with a final boss appearing after the time has expired. Several hidden chests also appeared throughout the space after defeating the final boss. Year 5 introduced a new activity called Bonfire Bash to replace the EAZ activity although the event takes place in the same EAZ location. A team of three players have a set time to face Taken enemies, as well as Hive, Cabal, or Fallen enemies to obtain igniters to light up a large bonfire at the center of the EAZ map, with a final boss appearing after time has expired. Completing this activity, as well as other activities, are required to upgrade the event's armor set.

The first Solstice of Heroes event was held from July 31 to August 28, 2018, to commemorate the first year of the game. The Power level cap was raised to 400 for the event. A new NPC called the Statue of Heroes was added and provided bounties that, when turned in, awarded Moments of Triumph points for players which could be used to earn exclusive rewards. Players received "Scorched" armor pieces at Power level 240 at the start of the event, which could then be upgraded to "Rekindled" armor at Power level 340, then to "Resplendent" armor at Power level 400, all by completing specific requirements for each armor piece, including playing through five revamped (Redux) missions from the original Destiny 2 campaign. Players could also earn Solstice Engrams, which also granted new rewards.

The event returned from July 30 to August 27, 2019, during Year 2's Season of Opulence with Eva Levante as the main vendor for the event. There was no Power level increase for this year (or future events), with the Power levels instead coinciding with the concurrent Power levels of the active season. The European Aerial Zone activity replaced the Redux missions as the event's main activity. Similar to the previous year, players also upgraded their armor, from Drained to Renewed to Majestic. The third event occurred during Year 3's Season of Arrivals and was held from August 11 to September 8, 2020, while the fourth event occurred during Year 4's Season of the Splicer and ran from July 6 to August 3, 2021. For both years, after players upgraded their armor—from Renewed to Majestic to Magnificent—they could complete more difficult challenges to earn a universal ornament to add a glow to any armor set. While the names of the armor sets remained the same for the third and fourth events, the physical appearances of the armor changed.

The event received a major overhaul when it returned from July 19 to August 9, 2022, during Year 5's Season of the Haunted, which included shortening the event's name to Solstice. Alongside the new Bonfire Bash activity, an Event Card that features event-specific challenges, as well as brand new cosmetics, was also made available, as well as an event Triumph Seal. The Event Card can be upgraded via Silver to unlock exclusive rewards. Completing challenges on the Event Card rewards Kindling, which is used to give each piece of Candescent armor a glow, while Silver Leaves are collected from any activity (while wearing at least one piece of event armor) and these Leaves are transformed into Silver Ash in the Bonfire Bash event. The Silver Ash is then used to upgrade the event's armor set and re-roll each armor piece's stat distribution.

Festival of the Lost
Festival of the Lost is a Halloween-themed event that was also first introduced in the original Destiny during Year 2 of that game, but it did not return until Destiny 2s Year 2. Like in the original Destiny, there are decorative masks for the players to wear, depicting one of the various characters in the game. These masks are required to be worn for completing the event's activities and earn the event's currency, candy.

For the events from 2018 to 2020, the main activity was the Haunted Forest, which took place in a darkened version of the Infinite Forest on Mercury. Players would clear as many sections of the forest as they could within a limited time, while also facing bosses. Once the overall time ran out, players were awarded with various rewards. Due to Mercury being placed in the Destiny Content Vault with the release of Beyond Light, the Haunted Forest also entered the vault. In 2021, a new activity was introduced for the event called Haunted Sectors, which were event-themed versions of the Lost Sectors activity located on the various destinations in the game. A new lore book called the Book of the Forgotten was added to be completed during the event and required Manifested Pages to unlock the lore entries. In addition to candy for other event items, players collected Spectral Pages through any activity in the game, and these were converted into Manifested Pages by defeating the minibosses called Headless Ones in the Haunted Sectors. Completing a Haunted Sector itself awarded other various rewards. In 2022, an Event Card was added for Festival of the Lost, which features event-specific challenges and can be upgraded via Silver to unlock exclusive rewards, as well as new cosmetics and an event Triumph Seal. The Haunted Sectors activity returned with a brand new Haunted Sector in the EDZ, as well as a new volume of the Book of the Forgotten.

Upon its return in Year 2 of Destiny 2, Festival of the Lost ran from October 16 to November 6, 2018, culminating in a three-week murder mystery quest that rewarded players with a returning Destiny exotic, the machine gun Thunderlord. Due to the delay of 2020's Beyond Light expansion (originally scheduled for September but delayed to November), Festival of the Lost occurred twice during Year 3. First was from October 29 to November 19, 2019, during Season of the Undying, then again from October 6 to November 3, 2020, during Season of Arrivals.. Festival of the Lost in Year 4 began on October 12 and ran to November 2, 2021, during Season of the Lost. The event returned in Year 5 and ran from October 18, 2022, to November 8, 2022, during Season of Plunder.

The Revelry
The Revelry was a spring- and Easter-themed event that occurred during Year 2's Season of the Drifter and ran from April 16 to May 6, 2019, with Eva Levante as the vendor for the event. In this event, an activity called the Verdant Forest was featured, and was similar to Festival of the Lost's Haunted Forest, but in the theme of the spring season. Unlike the Haunted Forest, where players battle bosses after clearing sections of the forest, players instead traveled back and forth through the Verdant Forest indefinitely. Players started the mode with four minutes on the clock and gained additional time for every enemy killed. Players continued through the forest, also battling bosses, until they ran out of time. Through the event, players could earn the exotic linear fusion rifle Arbalest, as well as a legendary armor set. The Revelry was replaced by the Guardian Games in 2020.

Moments of Triumph
Similar to the original Destiny, Destiny 2 features a yearly "Moments of Triumph" event, rewarding players for their various achievements from throughout the previous year, while also allowing players to complete certain triumphs before the year's end, along with new rewards. Additionally, players can unlock the ability to purchase exclusive event-related items from Bungie's website. The first Moments of Triumph in Destiny 2 occurred from July 31 to August 28, 2018. It returned during Year 2's Season of Opulence and occurred from July 9 to August 27, 2019. The 2020 event occurred during Year 3's Season of Arrivals and began on July 7 and was originally to conclude on September 22, but due to the delay of the Beyond Light expansion, the event was extended until November 10. The 2021 event then occurred during Year 4's Season of the Lost as part of Bungie's 30th anniversary event; it began on December 7, 2021, and concluded on February 21, 2022. The 2022 event occurred for the entirety of Year 5's Season of the Seraph, which began on December 6, 2022, and ran until the release of the Lightfall expansion on February 28, 2023.

Guardian Games
Guardian Games is an annual spring event that replaced The Revelry; the inaugural event was in honor of the 2020 Summer Olympics in Tokyo, Japan. During this event, the classes of players—Hunters, Titans, and Warlocks—compete against each other to earn points. The class with the most points by the end of the event wins, with a commemorative statue displayed in the Tower for the next year—the statue features each class' animal representative (snake for Hunters, lion for Titans, and eagle for Warlocks), and the winning class's animal is displayed in gold. To participate, players must equip a special event-specific class item, given to players upon starting the event, which also grant Laurels upon enemy kills; Laurels are the event's currency to purchase bounties and quests, as well as other rewards.

In the first event, which took place during Year 3's Season of the Worthy and ran from April 21 to May 11, 2020, players picked up bounties and quests from Eva Levante, and upon completing these, earned bronze, silver, or gold tokens. These tokens were turned into a new kiosk, the Guardian Games Podium, in the center of the Tower, with gold tokens giving the most points. Players could also obtain the exotic machine gun Heir Apparent, an event-exclusive reward. Titans won the inaugural Guardian Games.

The event returned during Year 4's Season of the Chosen and began on April 20 and concluded on May 10, 2021. Tokens were renamed as medals. In addition to bounties to gain XP and collect additional Laurels, players completed contender cards for Strikes, Crucible, or Gambit, each having random objectives in the activity to grant additional progress to complete the card, which rewarded gold medals; bronze medals were rewarded from completing any of the three core activities while silver medals were rewarded from completing Nightfalls. Additionally, platinum medals were added, which granted the most points, and were obtained through platinum cards for either Trials of Osiris or Nightfall: The Ordeal. A limited number of medals were also available from completing the event's triumphs. The Heir Apparent exotic machine gun also returned as an event reward and its exotic catalyst was added as an additional reward. Hunters won the 2021 Guardian Games.

The event returned during Year 5's Season of the Risen and ran from May 3 to May 24, 2022. New contender cards were added for Throne World destination activities and seasonal activities, which also earned gold medals, while new platinum cards for Throne World destination activities, season activities, and Lost Sectors were also added. Similar to the previous year's event, a limited number of medals were also available for completing the event's triumphs. Strike scoring from the original Destiny returned as part of two event-exclusive strike playlists, Recreational and Training/Competitive. The Recreational strike playlist worked similar to the regular Vanguard Ops playlist and was made available throughout the duration of the event. The Training playlist was only available from Tuesday to Thursday and the Competitive playlist was only available from Friday to Monday. By scoring in these playlists, players earned buffs that would last until the weekly reset, and could be used to light torches around the Guardian Games Podium in the Tower, which granted further rewards. The Heir Apparent exotic machine gun and its catalyst also returned as an event-exclusive reward, and a brand new event-exclusive legendary submachine gun, The Title, was also made available as a reward. Warlocks won the 2022 Guardian Games.

Guardian Games will return in May 2023 during Year 6's Season of Defiance''.

Notes

References

2017 video games
2018 video games
Action role-playing video games
Activision games
Bungie games
Destiny (video game series)
First-person shooters
Windows games
Multiplayer video games
PlayStation 4 games
Post-apocalyptic video games
Science fiction video games
Video games about amnesia
Video games set in Europe
Video games set on Mars
Lists of video game downloadable content
Video game downloadable content
Video game expansion packs
Xbox One games
Video games developed in the United States